LIM domain only protein 3 is a transcription co-factor, which in humans is encoded by the LMO3 gene. LMO3 interacts with the tumor suppressor p53 and regulates its function. LMO3 is considered to be an oncogene in Neuroblastoma.

References

Further reading